Foust–Carpenter and Dean Dick Farms are two historic farms and national historic district located near Whitsett, Guilford County, North Carolina. The district encompasses 27 contributing buildings and 1 contributing site and includes houses and agricultural outbuildings dating from the late-19th to mid-20th century.  They include the John C. and Barbara Foust House (c. 1898), Tenant House / John B. and Lucille Carpenter House, two barns, corn crib, packhouse, tobacco barn (c. 1920s, 1947), Tenant House (c. 1875), Carpenter Lake House (1940s), and Milking Barn.

It was listed on the National Register of Historic Places in 2009.

References

Farms on the National Register of Historic Places in North Carolina
Historic districts on the National Register of Historic Places in North Carolina
Houses completed in 1898
Buildings and structures in Guilford County, North Carolina
National Register of Historic Places in Guilford County, North Carolina